
Gmina Bierzwnik is a rural gmina (administrative district) in Choszczno County, West Pomeranian Voivodeship, in north-western Poland.

Villages
Gmina Bierzwnik contains the villages and settlements of Antoniewko, Bierzwnik, Bożejewko, Breń, Budzice, Bukowie, Chełmienko, Chyże, Czapliska, Dołżyna, Gajno, Górzno, Grzywna, Jaglisko, Kawno, Klasztorne, Kłodzin, Kołecko, Kolsk, Kosinek, Kruczaj, Krzywin, Kunica, Łasko, Malczewo, Ostromęcko, Piaseczno, Pławienko, Pławno, Płoszkowo, Przeczno, Przykuna, Rębusz, Smędowa, Sojec, Starzyce, Strumienno, Trzebicz, Wygon, Zdrójno, Zgorzel and Zieleniewo.

Neighbouring gminas
Gmina Bierzwnik is bordered by the gminas of Choszczno, Dobiegniew, Drawno, Krzęcin and Strzelce Krajeńskie.

References
Polish official population figures 2006

Bierzwnik
Choszczno County